Poland has a multi-party political system. On the national level, Poland elects the head of state – the president – and a legislature. There are also various local elections, referendums and elections to the European Parliament.

Poland has a long history of public elections dating back several centuries, beginning with the elections to Sejm in Łęczyca (known as the First Sejm) in 1182. Notably, since the Sejm of 1493, Polish kings were obliged to call regular Sejms and regional elections (sejmiks) every two years. From 1573 until 1795 the state system of elective monarchy in Poland required the royal elections of monarchs as well during the Sejm proceedings.

The first modern and free elections in 20th-century Poland were held in 1919, two months after the country regained independence in 1918 after over a century of partition and occupation by foreign powers. After the Second World War, Poland fell into the Soviet sphere of influence as a satellite state and became controlled by the communists, who rigged the elections of 1947 to ensure they controlled the entire Polish government. There were regular elections in Poland from that time on; however, no elections until the groundbreaking elections of 1989, marking the fall of communism, were free. The Polish communists secured a majority of the lower house seats in 1989, but allowed opposition parties to take up seats.

History

The first Polish Sejm was called in 1182. Since the Sejm of 1493, called by king John I Olbracht in 1493, Sejms were to be held every 2 years. There were also special Sejms when needed, for example the coronation sejms.

The most famous Sejms included the Sejm Niemy or the Silent Sejm of 1717 which marked the beginning of Russian control over Polish internal affairs; the subsequent Repnin Sejm or the Sejm of 1767/1768, whose terms were dictated by the Russian ambassador Repnin; the Great Sejm – or the Four-Years Sejm of 1798–1792, which voted for the May Constitution of Poland; and the Grodno Sejm – last Sejm of the First Republic.

Since the death of Sigismund II Augustus, last of the Jagiellonian dynasty, and following a brief period of interregnum, the entire nobility (szlachta) of the Commonwealth (10% of the population) could take part in the elections of the monarchs. Last elected king was Stanisław August Poniatowski in 1764. He abdicated in 1795 after the partitions of Poland ended the existence of sovereign state of Poland for 123 years.

It is disputed how free were elections held after 1926; in particular, the 1930 elections are often considered to have been non-free :pl:Wybory brzeskie. Polish presidents were elected by the Sejm and Senate (Zgromadzenie Narodowe), not in a popular vote. Before 1922, the Polish Chief of State was called Naczelnik Państwa.

Only the 1947 and 1989 elections can be considered as partially free. All others were controlled during that period. There were no direct presidential elections until 1990, with President Bolesław Bierut's nomination in 1947 by the Sejm and the abolition of the office by the 1952 constitution.

Polish elections 1573 to 1985

Polish election, Royal elections
1st 1573 Polish–Lithuanian royal election
2nd 1576 Polish–Lithuanian royal election
3rd 1587 Polish–Lithuanian royal election
4th 1632 Polish–Lithuanian royal election
5th 1648 Polish–Lithuanian royal election
6th 1669 Polish–Lithuanian royal election
7th 1674 Polish–Lithuanian royal election
8th 1697 Polish–Lithuanian royal election
9th 1704 Polish–Lithuanian royal election
10th 1733 Polish–Lithuanian royal election
11th 1764 Polish–Lithuanian royal election

Presidential elections
1st Polish election, 1922 (9 Dec)
2nd Polish election, 1922 (20 Dec)
3rd Polish election, 1926 (May)
4th Polish election, 1926 (Jun)
5th Polish election, 1933
6th Polish election, 1947

Legislative elections
1st Polish election, 1919
2nd Polish election, 1922
3rd Polish election, 1928
4th Polish election, 1930
5th Polish election, 1935
6th Polish election, 1938
7th Polish election, 1947
8th Polish election, 1952
9th Polish election, 1957
10th Polish election, 1961
11th Polish election, 1965
12th Polish election, 1969
13th Polish election, 1972
14th Polish election, 1976
15th Polish election, 1980
16th Polish election, 1985

Post-Communist Poland 

Since 1991, Polish elections operate according to a typical representative democracy.

Poland has a multi-party political system, with numerous parties in which no party often has any chance of gaining power by itself, and parties must work with each other to form coalition governments.

Poland elects on national level a head of state – the president –  and a legislature. The president is elected for a five-year term by the people. The National Assembly has two chambers. The parliament (Sejm) has 460 members, elected for a four-year term by party lists in multi-seat constituencies with a 5% threshold for single parties and 8% threshold for coalitions, (requirement waived for national minorities). The Senate (Senat) has 100 members elected for a four-year term via the first past-the-post system, with 100 single member constituencies. Prior to the 2011 parliamentary elections, elections to the Senate were conducted through plurality bloc voting in 40 multi-seat constituencies. Since 1991, elections have been supervised by National Electoral Commission (Państwowa Komisja Wyborcza), whose administrative division is called the National Electoral Office (Krajowe Biuro Wyborcze

End of Communist rule

1989 parliamentary elections

1989 Parliamentary Election: the Polish Round Table Agreement produced a partly open parliamentary election. The June election produced a Sejm (lower house), in which one-third of the seats went to communists and one-third went to the two parties which had hitherto been their coalition partners. The remaining one-third of the seats in the Sejm and all those in the Senate were freely contested; the majority of these were by candidates supported by Solidarity. Jaruzelski was elected by the Sejm as President of Poland.

The May 1990 local elections were entirely free. Candidates supported by Solidarity's Citizens' Committees won most of the elections they contested, although voter turnout was only a little over 40%. The cabinet was reshuffled in July 1990; the national defence and interior affairs ministers (hold-overs from the previous communist government) were among those replaced.

1990 presidential election

In October 1990, the constitution was amended to curtail the term of President Jaruzelski. In December, Lech Wałęsa became the first popularly elected President of Poland.

1991 parliamentary election

Poland's first free parliamentary elections were held in 1991. More than 100 parties participated, representing the full spectrum of political views. No single party received more than 13% of the total vote.

1993 parliamentary election

After a rough start, the second group of elections were held in 1993, and the first parliament to serve a full term. The Democratic Left Alliance (SLD) received the largest share of votes.

After the election, the SLD and Polish People's Party (PSL) formed a governing coalition. Waldemar Pawlak, leader of the junior partner PSL, became Prime Minister, later replaced by SLD's leader Józef Oleksy.

1995 presidential election

In November 1995, Poland held its second post-war free presidential election. SLD leader Aleksander Kwaśniewski defeated Wałęsa by a narrow margin—51.7% to 48.3%.

1997 parliamentary election

In 1997 parliamentary elections two parties with roots in the Solidarity movement – Solidarity Electoral Action (AWS) and the Freedom Union (UW) – won 261 of the 460 seats in the Sejm and formed a coalition government. Jerzy Buzek of the AWS became Prime Minister.  The AWS and the Democratic Left Allianc (SLD) held the majority of the seats in the Sejm. Marian Krzaklewski was the leader of the AWS, and Leszek Miller led the SLD. In June 2000, UW withdrew from the governing coalition, leaving AWS at the helm of a minority government.

Post-2000 elections

2000 presidential election

In the presidential election of 2000, Aleksander Kwaśniewski, the incumbent former leader of the post-communist Democratic Left Alliance (SLD), was re-elected in the first round of voting, with 53.9% of the popular vote. Second place, with only 17.3%, went to Andrzej Olechowski. It is thought that the opposition campaign was hindered by their inability to put forward a charismatic (or even a single major) candidate, as well as falling support for the centre-right Solidarity Electoral Action (AWS) government. This was related to internal friction in the ruling parliamentary coalition.

2001 parliamentary election

The 1997 Constitution and the changed administrative divisions of 1999 required a revision of the electoral system, which was passed in April 2001. The most important changes included: 
 the final liquidation of the party list (previously, some of the members of parliament were elected from a party list, based on nationwide voter support, rather than from local constituencies),
 modification of the method of allocating seats to the Sainte-Laguë method, which gave less premium to large parties. The latter change was reverted to the d'Hondt method in 2002.

In the September 2001 parliamentary elections, the SLD won on the back of voter disillusionment with the AWS government and internal bickering within that bloc. So much so that this former ruling party did not enter parliament, falling below the 8% threshold for coalitions (they had failed to form a formal political party, which has only a 5% threshold, and formally remained a "coalition" of parties).

The SLD formed a coalition with the agrarian Polish Peasant Party and leftist Labour Union (UP), with Leszek Miller as Prime Minister.

2005 presidential and parliament election

In the autumn of 2005 Poles voted in both parliamentary and presidential elections. September's parliamentary poll was expected to produce a coalition of two centre-right parties, Law and Justice (Prawo i Sprawiedliwość, PiS) and Civic Platform (Platforma Obywatelska, PO). PiS eventually gained 27% of votes cast and became the largest party in the sejm ahead of PO on 24%. The out-going ruling party, the left-wing Democratic Left Alliance (Sojusz Lewicy Demokratycznej, SLD), achieved just 11%. Presidential elections in October followed a similar script. The early favourite, Donald Tusk, leader of the PO, saw his opinion poll lead slip away and was beaten 54% to 46% in the second round by the PiS candidate Lech Kaczyński (one of the twins, founders of the party).  Both elections were blighted by low turn-outs—only 51% in the second and deciding round of the presidential election, and just over 40% in the parliamentary election. The suggested cause of the low turnout is popular disillusionment with politicians.

2006 local elections

2007 parliamentary election

In the October parliamentary elections, the Civic Platform (PO) won a stunning victory, the largest opposition party, which gained more than 41% of the popular vote. PiS's vote increased, from 2005, but insufficiently to gain reelection, whilst both Samoobrona and LPR were wiped out, losing all representation, each having gained only a little over 1% of the vote. PO proceeded to form a majority governing coalition with the agrarian Polish People's Party (PSL), with PO leader, Donald Tusk, taking over the prime ministerial office in November 2007.

2010 presidential election

On 10 April 2010, many members of the political elite were killed in the Smolensk air crash, including Lech Kaczyński, acting President of Poland.

At the presidential election in 2010, Donald Tusk decided not to present his candidature, considered easily winning over PiS leader Jarosław Kaczyński. At PO primary elections, Bronisław Komorowski defeated the Oxford-educated, PiS turncoat Foreign Minister Radosław Sikorski. At the polls, Komorowski defeated Jarosław Kaczyński, ensuring a PO dominance on all Polish political landscape.

In November 2010, local elections granted about 31 percent of the votes and PiS at 23 percent, an increase for the former and a drop for the latter compared to the 2006 elections. PO succeeded in winning four consecutive elections a record in post-communist Poland.

2011 parliamentary election

The parliamentary election to both the Sejm and the Senate was held on 9 October 2011. The previous election, in 2007, resulted in a Civic Platform–Polish People's Party (PSL) government. All seats of both houses were up for re-election.

Civic Platform (PO), led by Prime Minister Donald Tusk, was aiming for re-election: a feat that hadn't been achieved since Poland became a democracy. The PSL was previously the smaller partner to the Civic Platform in the governing coalition, and had said that it wished to continue this relationship after the election.

2015 parliamentary election

The parliamentary election to both the Sejm and the Senate was held in October 2015. The previous election, in 2011, resulted in a Civic Platform–Polish People's Party (PSL) government. All seats of both houses are up for re-election.

The process of election for the Sejm is through party-list proportional representation via the D'Hondt method in multi-seat constituencies, with a 5% threshold for single parties and 8% threshold for coalitions (requirements waived for national minorities). 
The following coalition has been signed already: Law and Justice (PiS) between United Poland (SP) and Polska Razem (PR).

2019 parliamentary election

The 2019 Polish parliamentary elections were held on 13 October 2019. All 460 members of the Sejm and 100 senators of the Senate were elected. The ruling Law and Justice (PiS) retained its majority in the Sejm, but lost its majority in the Senate to the opposition. With 43.6% of the popular vote, Law and Justice received the highest vote share by any party since Poland returned to democracy in 1989. The turnout was the highest for a parliamentary election since the first free elections after the fall of communism in 1989. For the first time after 1989, the ruling party controls one house (Sejm) and opposition controls the second (Senate).

2020 presidential election

The 2020 Polish presidential elections first round was held on 28 June 2020 and was completed with a second round of voting on 12 July 2020.

See also 
Electoral districts of Poland

Notes

References

External links
Adam Carr's Election Archive
Parties and elections
Państwowa Komisja Wyborcza – National Electoral Commission 
Warsaw Consolidates the Countries of Eastern and Central Europe
Jan Rokita: The Triumph of the Politician – Intellectual
Kaczynski Brothers: Movie Stars That Turned Politicians
Elections 2005: Brief Information About the Participants
The Elections to the Polish Parliament (Sejm) 1919 – 1947 (results)